Arachno Creek or Spider Creek is a creek in Navarre, Florida, United States. It is a third of a mile long, and connects to the East Bay River. Its name comes from the commonality of arachnids and spiderwebs along its span. Though it is debated, it is currently believed to have been named by a local Boy Scout from Gulf Breeze. It is completely located on the grounds of Eglin Air Force Base. It can be accessed by boat or kayak via the East Bay River Public Boat Ramp. The creek has been calculated to have a discharge rate of 21 cubic feet per second.

References 
h.

Rivers of Florida
Bodies of water of Santa Rosa County, Florida
Navarre, Florida